Virasaat is an Indian Hindi-language television series that aired on Sahara TV in 2002.

Overview
The story portrays the lives of Sahani family's members & captures the ups and downs of the six Sahni siblings — four brothers and two sisters. However, the story is mainly based on the emotional bonding between the stepson, Manav & his stepmother, Jayashree.

The trials and tribulations for 'Sahnis' begin after the death of the head of household, Mr. Sahani.  This is when the whole family is thrown out of their vary own house by their uncle, Omkar who cheats to obtain their property. Nevertheless, Mrs. Sahani tries to fight back and stands up for her family.  But her own sons withdraw to help & joins their uncle's misdeed. This is when the stepson, Manav takes up the responsibility to support his stepmother & start the life from the scratch.

Cast 
Suhasini Mulay ... Jayashree Sahani 
Jaya Bhattacharya
Vaquar Shaikh ... Manav Sahani
Anupam Bhattacharya
Juhi Parmar
Kabir Sadanand
Rajiv Kumar
Malavika Shivpuri
Deepak Dutta
Chhavi Mittal
Jyati Bhatia
Harsh Somaiya

References 
Virasaat News Article
Virasaat Article "Quest for Creativity"
Sahara One Virasaat Article: "All in the Family"

2002 Indian television series debuts
Indian drama television series
Indian television series
Indian television soap operas
Sahara One original programming